Ernest C. Heath was an English professional footballer who played as a goalkeeper.

Career
Born in Rotherham, Heath played for Gainsborough Trinity, Bradford City and Bury.

For Bradford City he made 3 appearances in the Football League.

Sources

References

Year of birth missing
Year of death missing
English footballers
Gainsborough Trinity F.C. players
Bradford City A.F.C. players
Bury F.C. players
English Football League players
Association football goalkeepers